The Biate language, also known as Biete language, is a Sino-Tibetan language spoken by the Biete people in several parts of northeast India]. Biate is pronounced as Bia-te (the e in te pronounced as "a").

Geographical distribution
Biate is spoken in the following locations (Ethnologue).

Assam: Dima Hasao District and Cachar district
Meghalaya: West Jaintia Hills, East Jaintia Hills and East Khasi Hills district
Manipur: Churachandpur district
Mizoram: Aizawl district
Tripura: Jampui Hills

Basic vocabulary

Numbers

References

Languages of Assam
Languages of Manipur
Languages of Meghalaya
Languages of Mizoram
Endangered languages of India